Galician may refer to:

 Something of, from, or related to Galicia (Spain) 
 Galician language
 Galician people
 Gallaeci, a large Celtic tribal federation who inhabited Gallaecia (currently Galicia (Spain)
 Something of, from, or related to Galicia (Eastern Europe)
 SS Galician a liner later renamed the HMHS Glenart Castle

See also 
 Galicia (disambiguation)
 Halychian (disambiguation)

Language and nationality disambiguation pages